Barney is an unincorporated community in Brooks County, Georgia, United States. Barney has a post office with ZIP code 31625.

History
Barney was named after the Barney & Smith Car Company in 1897, at the time the railroad first was extended through the area. A post office called Barney has been in operation since 1897. The Georgia General Assembly incorporated Barney as a town in 1903. The town was officially dissolved in 1995.

Transport
Barney's major highways are 122 that goes through Thomasville, Pattern, Pavo, Barney, Hahira, and Lakeland. The other one is highway 76 or Adel highway that goes through Greenville, Florida, Quitman, Morven, Barney, Adel, and Nashville.

Education
Barney shares schools with Quitman and Morven

References

External links
 Bethel Primitive Baptist Church historical marker

Former municipalities in Georgia (U.S. state)
Populated places disestablished in 1995
Unincorporated communities in Brooks County, Georgia
Unincorporated communities in Georgia (U.S. state)